Olgiati (pronounced "ol-jotty") is an Italian and Swiss surname. Notable people with this name include:

 Gerolamo Olgiati, government official in Milan.
 Giuseppe Olgiati, Roman Catholic bishop.
 P.R. Olgiati, Tennessee politician.
 Rudolf Olgiati, Swiss architect.
 Valerio Olgiati, Swiss architect.

See also
 Olgiati Bridge, highway bridge in Chattanooga, Tennessee named after the politician and mayor.